Dukakis is a surname.  Notable people with the surname include:

 John Dukakis (born John A. Chaffetz), actor, son of Kitty Dukakis and stepson of Michael Dukakis
 Kitty Dukakis (Katharine D. Dukakis), author, wife of Michael Dukakis
 Michael Dukakis, former Massachusetts governor and 1988 Democratic Party presidential candidate
 Olympia Dukakis, American actress, cousin of Michael Dukakis